Bhagwan Mahaveer Sanctuary and Mollem National Park is a  protected area located in the Western Ghats of West India, in Dharbandora taluk, Goa State, along the eastern border with Karnataka. National Highway 4A divides it into two parts and the Mormugao - Londa railway line passes through the area. It is located between 15°15"30' to 15°29"30' N and 74°10"15' to 74°20"15' E. It contains several important temples dating to the Kadambas of Goa, and home to waterfalls, such as Dudhsagar Falls and Tambdi Falls. The parkland is also home to a community of nomadic buffalo herders known as the Dhangar.

History
This area was first known as Mollem Game Sanctuary. It was declared a wildlife sanctuary in 1969 and renamed as Bhagwan Mahaveer Sanctuary. The core area of the sanctuary covering  was notified as Mollem National Park in 1978.

Flora and fauna
This sanctuary contains pristine vegetation classified as West Coast tropical evergreen forests, West Coast semi-evergreen forests and moist deciduous forests. The evergreen forests are mainly seen at higher altitudes and along the river banks. The predominant species are Terminalia, Lagerstroemia, Xylia and Dalbergia. The forest canopy is almost closed and the availability of grass is very limited. There are several perennial water sources in the sanctuary and the availability of water is not a limiting factor for wildlife.

Plant diversity
Bhagwan Mahaveer National Park and surrounding area harbors 722 species of flowering plants in wild belonging to 492 genera and 122 families. 128 species of endemic plants either endemic to Western Ghats, Peninsular India or India occur in the National Park. Two recently described taxa viz. Glyphochloa veldkampii M. A. Fonseca et Janarth. and Amorphophallus commutatus (Schott) Engl. var. anmodensis Sivad. & Jaleel are strictly restricted to the National Park. Additionally 37 species of Pteridophytes are also found in the National Park.

Mammals
Wild mammals recorded in the sanctuary include the leopard (particularly the black variant), barking deer, Bengal tiger, bonnet macaque, common langur, civet, flying squirrel, gaur, Malabar giant squirrel, mouse deer, pangolin, porcupine, slender loris, sambar, spotted deer, wild boar and wild dog.

In May 2019, two tigers from Karnataka were photographed by camera traps in the park, and a tigress and her cubs were photographed in Mhadei Wildlife Sanctuary, the first sightings in Goa since 2013.

Birds
Popular birds which can be seen in the sanctuary include: drongo, emerald dove, fairy bluebird, golden oriole, greater Indian hornbill, Indian black woodpecker, Malabar grey hornbill, Malabar pied hornbill, grey-headed myna, grey jungle fowl, large green barbet, paradise flycatcher, racket-tailed drongo, ruby-throated yellow bulbul (the Goa state bird), shrikes, three-toed kingfisher, Sri Lanka frogmouth, wagtails. This sanctuary contains quite a few birds which are endemic to the Indian subcontinent, specifically southern India.

Butterflies
Some of the many interesting butterfly specimens in the area are: blue Mormon, common Jezebel, common Mormon, common mime, plum Judy, common wanderer, crimson rose, lime butterfly, plain tiger, southern birdwing and tailed jay and one of the most common is the Pygmy scrub-hopper. It also has endemic species like Malabar tree nymph and Tamil yoeman.

Reptiles
This sanctuary is famous for its snakes, particularly the king cobra. Also here are: bronzeback tree snake, cat snake, hump-nosed pit viper, Indian rock python, Malabar pit viper, rat snake, Russell's viper, Indian cobra and  common krait,

Attractions
This sanctuary and national park contain several geological, cultural and visitor service attractions that make this largest protected area in Goa a popular visitor destination.

Tambdi Surla Temple

The temple consists of garbhagriha, antarala and a pillared Nandi mandapa built of basalt. The four pillars, embellished with intricate carvings of elephants and chains support a stone ceiling decorated with finely carved lotus flowers of the Ashtoken variety.

Dudhsagar Falls

At , it is Goa's tallest waterfall, India's fifth tallest, and is 227th in the world  A viaduct of the South Western Railways passes spectacularly through the waterfalls. This popular destination may be reached by hiking along the 10 km one lane dirt road or hiring a 4-wheel drive vehicle at Collem. Access is dangerous and restricted during the monsoon season of June to September.

Devils Canyon
This is an eerie canyon of water carved crevises downstream from Dudh Sagar Falls, created from solid rock by serpentine underwater currents. It is just off the main trail soon past the Collem entry point.

Tambdi Falls

This waterfall, located about 2 km southwest  of Tambdi Surla, at the Karnataka border, is equally spectacular and only slightly less tall than Dudsagar Falls, however it is rarely visited because of its difficult access by a steep, winding and irregular rocky path. A local guide is required.

Sunset Point
This point provides a scenic view of the park, revealing an expanse of closed canopy treetops. It can be reached by park vehicles, hired at Mollem check-point, driving along a zig-zagging road carved from the mountain.

Threats
This protected area is threatened by extensive surface mining and transport of manganese and iron ores. A serious threat is the deposit of toxic wastes. In 2006, nearly 13 truckloads of sponge iron by-products had been dumped in the Mollem Wildlife Sanctuary and at Anmod Ghat, The settlement of private rights and concessions has still not been done away with. Some private lands are still within the sanctuary and need to be acquired in due course of time.

Three Infrastructural Projects: 2020 
In December 2019, a newly constituted State Wildlife Advisory Board (SWLAB) met for approximately an hour. They discussed many projects, including the doubling of the railway line, a transmission line and a highway expansion proposal that would affect the Bhagwan Mahavir Wildlife Sanctuary.

The projects first came into public view when a wildlife scientist wrote a cover-story in The Hindu in May 2020 that pointed out that two of these projects- the transmission line and the highway, were cleared during the lockdown. These projects would require the felling of at least 91 hectares (9,10,000 square meters) of forest.

On World Environment Day (June 5) 2020, a group of around 150 scientists, academicians, conservationists and concerned citizens from across the country wrote to Union Minister of Forests and Environment Prakash Javadekar. They urged him to reconsider the approvals granted to the three projects that threatened the Bhagwan Mahaveer Wildlife Sanctuary and the Mollem National Park. By this time, the number of trees to be felled were pegged at 55,000.

During the one day Goa Legislative Assembly session in July 2020, the Chief Minister of Goa, Pramod Sawant, who also holds the forest portfolio admitted that almost 70,000 trees would be cut down for the three projects. A couple of days after the Assembly session, the Leader of Opposition, Digambar Kamat, wrote to the Central Empowered Committee (CEC) of the Supreme Court stating that he was not in favour of the “dubious forest clearances” given to the three projects. He lamented that the projects were being viewed in isolation, instead of as part of Goa's largest protected area.

In October 2020, on a visit to Goa, Union Minister for Environment, Forest and Climate Change Prakash Javadekar said at a press conference that he was not aware about the opposition to the three controversial linear projects proposed in and around the protected forests at the Wildlife Sanctuary. He said that he had received no written objections to the projects, despite environmental activists and other various groups from the state sending the Ministry of Environment, Forests and Climate Change dozens of written representations digitally and by post.

A few days later, Curtorim MLA Aleixo Reginaldo Lourenco sent a letter to the Ministry of Environment, as well as the Goa Chief Minister saying that their feigning ignorance on the protests was disturbing to Goans. He reiterated that numerous Goans including students, teachers, architects, artists, scientists, and travel and tourism operators, had written to him over four months on the issue, and that he had written to the Centre over the issue of Mollem being stripped of its green cover.

Around the same time, noted Konkani writer Damodar Mauzo in a video on Mollem, urged Goans to unite and back the people of Mollem in their fight to save the forests from destruction. In the video, he also recited a poem on the ongoing struggle to save the forests penned by a Mollem local Sharaschandra Khandeparkar.

References

External links 
 

IUCN Category II
Wildlife sanctuaries in Goa
National parks in Goa
Protected areas established in 1969
Malabar Coast moist forests
Geography of South Goa district
Tourist attractions in South Goa district
1969 establishments in Goa, Daman and Diu